Elijah F. Smith (December 1792 – September 12, 1879) was the 8th mayor of Rochester, New York.

Biography
Smith came to Rochester from Groton, Connecticut in 1826 when he opened a store, Smith & Perkins, on Main Street. He became involved in city affairs and served as an alderman before 1840 when he was elected Mayor.  He was the first Mayor of Rochester to be elected by the people of the city, following an 1840 New York State law requiring that all mayors be publicly elected. In March 1841, Smith was reelected to a second term. His time in office saw the annexation to the city of the Mount Hope Cemetery area, but other improvements were prevented by the ongoing national depression.

After his term as Mayor, Smith held other offices in the city. He served as a trustee for the University of Rochester until his death in 1880. He is buried in Mount Hope Cemetery.

References

External links

 

1792 births
1879 deaths
Burials at Mount Hope Cemetery (Rochester)
Mayors of Rochester, New York
19th-century American politicians